Rekandar Nageswara Rao, popularly known as Surabhi Babji (1 June 1949 – 9 June 2022) was an Indian thespian, and director, known for his works in Telugu theatre. He was honored by the Government of India, in 2013, by bestowing on him the Padma Shri, the fourth highest civilian award, for his contributions to the field of art.

Early life
Rekander Nageswar Rao, born in a theatre-owning family, in the remote village of Gimidi Peta in Srikakulam district, in Andhra Pradesh, in India, is a fourth generation theatre owner. His forefathers, viz. Rekander Chiina Venkatrao, who founded the Sri Venkateswara Natya Mandali (Surabhi) in 1937, Rekandar Dasaradhi Rao and Rekandar Bhoja Raju were well known theatre personalities. He took charge of running the theatre group in 1973.

Notable works
Some of his notable plays are Lavakusa, Mayabazar, Anasuya, Sri Veera Brahmam gari Charitra, Harishnandra, Bobbili Yuddham, Balanagamma, Chintamani, and Rangoon rowdy. He has also assisted B. V. Karanth, renowned Kannada director, in a play by the  name of Chandi Priya.

Awards and recognitions
Rekander Nageshwar Rao is a recipient of the Sangeet Natak Akademi Award, which he received in 2011. Later, the Government of India honoured him with the civilian award of Padma Shri, in 2013.

References

External links
 

1949 births
2022 deaths
Telugu-language writers
Andhra University alumni
20th-century Indian dramatists and playwrights
Indian male dramatists and playwrights
Telugu-language dramatists and playwrights
Recipients of the Padma Shri in arts
Telugu people
Indian male stage actors
Indian theatre managers and producers
Recipients of the Sangeet Natak Akademi Award
Indian theatre directors
Male actors from Andhra Pradesh
People from Srikakulam district
20th-century Indian male actors
Dramatists and playwrights from Andhra Pradesh
Male actors in Telugu theatre
20th-century Indian male writers